Sondheimer is an unincorporated community in East Carroll Parish, Louisiana, United States. Sondheimer has a post office with ZIP code 71276.

Sondheimer was named for Emanuel Sondheimer, founder of the Chicago-based lumber company that purchased the original tracts of timberland that became the community.

References

Unincorporated communities in East Carroll Parish, Louisiana
Unincorporated communities in Louisiana